William Leslie or Bill Leslie may refer to:

William Leslie, 3rd Earl of Rothes (died 1513), Scottish nobleman, briefly Earl of Rothes in 1513, killed at Flodden Field
Sir William Leslie, 3rd Baronet (died c. 1680), one of the Leslie baronets
Wilhelm von Leslie (1718–1727), bishop of Laybach
William Leslie (British Army officer) (1751–1777), son of Earl of Leven, killed at the Battle of Princeton
William Leslie of Nethermuir (1802–1879), architect and Lord Provost of Aberdeen
William Leslie (MP) (1814–1880), Scottish politician and MP for Aberdeenshire
William Leslie (footballer) (fl. 1893–1904), Scottish footballer of the late 19th century
William Leslie (rugby league) (fl. 1908), rugby league player in the New South Wales Rugby League's foundation
 (1925–2003), American jazz musician
William Leslie (actor) (1925–2005), American actor
Bill Leslie (journalist) (born 1952), American journalist and musician
Bill Leslie (commentator) (born 1971), British football commentator

See also
William Lesley (1820–1876), New South Wales, Australia politician.